With regards to music, 38 may refer to:

 Beethoven – Piano Trio in E-flat major
 Brahms – 20 Deutsche Volkslieder
 Draeseke – Symphony No. 4 in G major
 Raff – Juliet's Waltz by Ch. Gounod
 Ries – Recitative and Aria